Mateusz Kowalski (born 30 September 1986 in Kraków) is a Polish retired footballer who played as a centre-back.

Career
He is a trainee of Wisła Kraków and joined the first team in 2008. He made his Ekstraklasa debut in August 2008 against GKS Bełchatów, playing the full match. In February 2009 he was loaned out to Piast Gliwice, also in the Ekstraklasa.

Honours

Wisła Kraków (ME)
 Młoda Ekstraklasa: 2007–08

Wisła Kraków
Ekstraklasa: 2008–09, 2010–11

Statistics
 (Correct as of 29 May 2013)

References

External links
 

Living people
1986 births
Footballers from Kraków
Association football defenders
Polish footballers
Poland youth international footballers
Kolejarz Stróże players
Piast Gliwice players
Wisła Kraków players
Bruk-Bet Termalica Nieciecza players
Sandecja Nowy Sącz players
Garbarnia Kraków players
Ekstraklasa players
I liga players
II liga players
III liga players
Polish expatriate footballers
Expatriate footballers in Norway
Polish expatriate sportspeople in Norway